Lauren Brown is an American percussionist, known for her skill as a "tap dancing drummer."

Biography 
Brown first learned to dance at a young age; she knows modern, tap, jazz and ballet dance styles.

Brown is best known as an original member of the band He's My Brother She's My Sister, founded by her then-future husband Rob Kolar and his sister Rachel.

To create her rhythm, Brown uses her feet as a replacement for the hi-hat, while simultaneously playing the snare drum, tom drum and bass drum with her arms. She is known for her invention of "tap dancing drumming" and considered its founder. The Huffington Post wrote that "Lauren Brown's bouncy moves atop a big bass drum [...] will certainly get your attention."

As a member of He's My Brother She's My Sister, Brown toured extensively throughout the US, including such festivals as Bonnaroo, Summerfest, Firefly, Secret Garden Party and Austin City Limits. She performed with the group on an April 2013 episode of The Late Late Show with Craig Ferguson.

Brown and He's My Brother She's My Sister bandmate Rob Kolar married in 2014, and they co-founded the group KOLARS in 2016. In March 2016, KOLARS released a music video for their song "Beyond The World Of Man'.

Brown and Rob Kolar divorced in 2021 and she left KOLARS following the split.

Lauren Brown appeared on The Late Late Show With James Corden on March 22, 2021-performing with friends Beck and Joy Downer, directed by Sam Taylor Johnson.

Brown's brother in law is comedian Ken M.

References 

Living people
American drummers
American women drummers
Year of birth missing (living people)
21st-century American women